Belodon (meaning "arrow tooth") is a genus of phytosaur, a crocodile-like reptile that lived during the Triassic. Its fossils have been found in Europe and elsewhere. The type species, Belodon plieningeri, was named by prolific German paleontologist Christian Erich Hermann von Meyer in 1844.

Many other species were also named, among them Belodon buceros (named by Edward Drinker Cope in 1881), Belodon kapfii (von Meyer, 1861), Belodon lepturus (Cope, 1870), Belodon priscus (originally described as Compsosaurus priscus by Joseph Leidy in 1856), Belodon scolopax (Cope, 1881), and Belodon validus (Othniel Charles Marsh, 1893). Some paleontologists of the late 19th and early 20th century believed Belodon was synonymous with Phytosaurus or Machaeroprosopus.

References

External links
 Phytosauria Translation and Pronunciation Guide from Dinosauria.com

Phytosaurs
Prehistoric reptile genera
Late Triassic reptiles of Europe
Late Triassic reptiles of North America
Fossil taxa described in 1844
Taxa named by Christian Erich Hermann von Meyer